How Many Billboards? Art Instead, was a large scale urban art exhibition in Los Angeles, California. The 2010 exhibition concurrently displayed 21 unique billboards created by various leading contemporary Californian artists. 

Organized by MAK Center director Kimberli Meyer and co-curated by Nizan Shaked and Dr. Gloria Sutton, the exhibition asked artists "to create a new work that critically responded to the medium of the billboard and interpreted its role in the urban landscape". Contemporary artist Martha Rosler and Josh Neufeld were among the commissioned artists.

Organizer's Statement

Participating Artists 
 Kenneth Anger
 Michael Asher
 Jennifer Bornstein
 Eileen Cowin
 Christina Fernandez
 Ken Gonzales-Day
 Renée Green
 Kira Lynn Harris
 John Knight
 David Lamelas
 Brandon Lattu
 Daniel Joseph Martinez
 Kori Newkirk
 Yvonne Rainer
 Martha Rosler with Josh Neufeld
 Allen Ruppersberg
 Allan Sekula
 Susan Silton
 Kerry Tribe
 James Welling
 Lauren Woods

References 

https://www.fastcompany.com/1559860/los-angeles-swaps-21-billboards-art

External links 

 http://www.howmanybillboards.org/

Art exhibitions in the United States